The Balele Mountains (Balelesberg or sometimes Belelasberg in Afrikaans) are a mountain massif largely located in the KwaZulu-Natal province in South Africa.

Geography 
The Balele Mountains stretch north of the town of Utrecht, which lies at their foot, south-east of Wakkerstroom and Volksrust (in Mpumalanga), and north-east of the Newcastle region. Vaalkop is the highest point.

Geology 
As on the eastern slopes of the Drakensberg, the dolerite dominates the collapsing cliffs of the Balele Mountains.

History 
Early in the 20th century, the Utrecht Collieries Company began mining coal in the Balele Mountains. In 1906, the governor of Natal decided to build a railway line between Utrecht and Newcastle. The line was inaugurated in 1910 by the then governor Lord Methuen.

References 

Mountain ranges of South Africa